Walnut Grove is a historic house located  southwest of Bayou Rapides and about  southeast of Cheneyville, Louisiana.

Description and history 
This plantation house was designed by Jabez Tanner and built in 1830. It is a two-story building with a modified central hall plan and a hip roof. A front porch was added in 1927 and there has been reworking of the ground floor including closing in the previously open central hall. A Queen Anne stairway and arch have also been added. There is a new construction tin roof with roof hatchway. The house originally featured a large formal garden in the front. The two story brick building is an example of Federal architecture with its five bay articulation, fanlights and hip roof. It was added to the National Register of Historic Places on November 21, 1980.

See also
 Historic preservation
 National Register of Historic Places in Rapides Parish, Louisiana
 Slavery in the United States

References

External links
 * 
 

Houses on the National Register of Historic Places in Louisiana
Federal architecture in Louisiana
Houses completed in 1830
Houses in Rapides Parish, Louisiana
1830 establishments in Louisiana
National Register of Historic Places in Rapides Parish, Louisiana